The 1998–99 B Group was the forty-third season of the Bulgarian B Football Group, the second tier of the Bulgarian football league system. A total of 16 teams contested the league.

Chernomorets Burgas, Belasitsa Petrich and Olimpik Galata were promoted to Bulgarian A Group. Dimitrovgrad, Chardafon Gabrovo, Akademik Sofia and Olimpik-Hadzhi Dimitar Sliven were relegated.

League table

References

1998-99
Bul
2